Shennongjia Hongping Airport  is an airport serving the Shennongjia forestry district in the west of Hubei province. Construction started in April 2011 with a total investment of over 1 billion yuan. The airport was opened on 8 May 2014, with an inaugural China Eastern Airlines flight from Shanghai Pudong International Airport with a stop in Wuhan.

The airport attracted controversy in China when the media reported that its construction involved significant damage to the environment, as many hills were leveled and caves filled in the Shennongjia natural preserve.

Facilities
It is projected to handle 250,000 passengers annually by 2020.

Airlines and destinations

See also
List of airports in China
List of the busiest airports in China
List of highest airports

References

Airports in Hubei
Shennongjia
Airports established in 2014
2014 establishments in China